Dalitso Kabambe (born 17 November 1973) is an economist, banker and politician from Malawi. He served as the 13th Governor of the Reserve Bank of Malawi from 2017 until 2020
.

Career
Kabambe is a Malawian development economist who was appointed Governor for the Reserve Bank of Malawi on 21 April 2017 by the then Malawi President Peter Mutharika.

Prior to his governorship of the country's central bank, Kabambe worked in the Malawi Government Economic Service for a period of 19 years from 1998. He held different positions such as Principal Economist, Chief Economist, Deputy Director of Economic Planning and, Budget Director in the Ministry of Finance, Economic Planning and Development. He was the Director of Planning and Policy Development at the Ministry of Health from 2013 to 2015, where he was also in charge of the national health budget. He served as Secretary for Foreign Affairs and International Cooperation for close to 2 years. He was replaced as governor by Wilson Banda on 9 July 2020.

Personal life
Kabambe is married to Brigitte Kabambe. The couple has three children. He is a member of the Seventh-day Adventist Church where he is also a Church Elder.

Education
He holds a PhD and a master's degree in Development Economics from Imperial College, University of London, United Kingdom which he obtained in 2008 and 2001 respectively. He got his first degree from the University of Malawi in 1998.

Joining politics
Kabambe publicly announced his decision to join active politics on 31 December 2020 when he was unveiled as a member of the opposition Democratic Progressive Party (Malawi). Media reports indicate Kabambe will run to be leader of the party in order to stand as its torchbearer in the 2025 Malawi presidential elections. He is yet to announce his candidacy for the DPP leadership seat.

Controversies
Kabambe was rocked in a salary controversy when it emerged that as governor of Malawi's central bank, his monthly perk was billed at K24 million (about US$30,000). In an interview with Zodiak, Kabambe confirmed the reports, saying his salary was approved by the Bank's board in line with the Reserve Bank of Malawi Act of Parliament and his years of service.

While reports indicate that salary for Kabambe's successor, Wilson Banda, has been reviewed, this has not yet been evidentially confirmed by any of the country's media outlets. One of the country's civil society organisations (CSOs) described as politically motivated the forensic audit that leaked Kabambe's salary owing to the ex-governor's decision to join active politics. The organisation, Centre for Democracy and Economic Development (CDEDI), claimed in a report that it released to the media that the audit was illegal and that the leakage smacked of a conspiracy to stop Kabambe from becoming DPP's torchbearer in order to oust the incumbent president, Lazarus Chakwera in the 2025 Malawi presidential elections. The organisation called the audit illegal.

In May, 2021, the Lilongwe Water Board released names of owners of residences with illegal water connections in local newspapers in an unprecedented "name and shame" campaign. Dr. Kabambe's name appeared on the list. Despite efforts to clear his name in the media, there are still concerns that he authorized an illegal water connection to his house, concerns that cast a shadow on his longshot bid for the presidency in 2025.

In December 2021, Dalitso Kabambe was accused of manipulating accounts to obtain a loan from the International Monetary Fund while he was director of the central bank of Malawi.

References

External links 
Facebook

Governors of the Reserve Bank of Malawi
21st-century Malawian economists
Living people
Kabambe, Dalitso
Alumni of the University of London
Alumni of Imperial College London
Democratic Progressive Party (Malawi) politicians
People from Thyolo District